James Charles "J.C." Mack (born August 10, 1988) is a professional footballer currently playing for National League side Napier City Rovers. Mack also serves as captain of the U.S. Virgin Islands.

Career

Youth and amateur

Growing up in Columbus, Ohio, Mack began playing for his local club NCSL Eagles where he won two Ohio South state championships in 2003 and 2004. In 2004 Mack was spotted by ex U.S. national team goalkeeper Juergen Sommer. Failing to win a third consecutive State championship, Mack left Ohio to play for Sommers' Indianapolis based club Carmel United Cosmos. While playing under Sommer Mack would win an Indiana state championship and catch the eye of Caleb Porter, the newly appointed head coach at The University of Akron. In 2006 Mack committed to The University of Akron, but would forgo university after being given a chance to trial in the professional game. Struggling to catch on in MLS the young striker would spend 2007 trialing abroad, garnering contract offers in Peru and Trinidad respectively before the Chicago Fire Premier gave the 19-year-old striker a development opportunity in the USL Super Y-League. Seizing the opportunity Mack scored 11 goals in 16 games for Chicago, winning a USL Super 20 National Championship in 2008. Mack was also called in to play with Chicago Fire Premier in the USL Premier Development League this same year.

Chicago and abroad 

After high school graduation in 2007, Mack earned a trial with the Chicago Fire of Major League Soccer, only to arrive hours after the dismissal of then head coach Dave Sarachan. Amongst the regime change and lack of professional experience Mack would eventually be passed on, spending the next year trialing abroad and developing in the Fire youth program. In 2009, Mack moved to France and went on trial with CS Louhans-Cuiseaux 71 in the French Championnat National. The three-month training period at Louhans concluded with 5 preseason matches tallying 2 assists with appearances coming against sides like Dijon FCO and Evian Thonon Gaillard F.C. Due to non-EU roster restrictions, Louhans would eventually be denied a permit for Mack shortly before the 2009/2010 season. Mack then Joined Union sport Tourcoing Football Club in November 2009. On November 21, 2009, Mack made his debut for Tourcoing at the hour mark in a 2–1 loss to US Marquette FC in the 7th round of the Coupe de France. Playing with Tourcoing, the 20-year-old converted midfielder would appear 19 times in the 2009/2010 season finding the net 9 times.

Charleston 

In 2011, after impressing head coach Michael Anhaeuser during the 2011 Carolina Challenge Cup, Mack signed with Charleston Battery in the USL Professional Division on March 23, 2011. He made his debut for the club on April 16, 2011, in a game against the Dayton Dutch Lions. In a Lamar Hunt U.S. Open Cup match against amateur side Regals FC, Mack suffered a season ending foot injury cutting his 2011 campaign short after only 11 appearances. Intense rehabilitation saw him make a full recovery in October 2011, spending November training in Denmark with FC Fyn. In 2012 Mack returned to Charleston but saw very little playing time, primarily used as a secondary midfield option to a veteran Tony Donatelli. With the time Mack was given he showed extremely potent scoring 2 goals after his first 57 minutes of league play. Mack would prove to be an important asset for Charleston when the USL-Pro post season saw the Semi-final match end in penalties. Converting the last penalty of the night Mack secured a spot in the USL-Pro Championship match for the Battery. Charleston would go on to beat the Wilmington Hammerheads 1–0 in the USL Pro Championship Match.

Tampa Bay Rowdies

In the winter of 2012/2013, Mack received a trial invitation to the 2012 NASL Champion Tampa Bay Rowdies, which he accepted making an appearance at the Walt Disney Classic against the Montreal Impact. Mack would be the last player released upon the acquisition of veteran striker Georgi Hristov.

Thailand
In lieu of taking a trial spot on a PDL team, Mack seized upon an opportunity to go on trial with Port FC in Klong Toei, Bangkok, Thailand. After the extended trial in Bangkok, Port F.C. would run out funds for foreign player roster space. A second extended trial period with Pattaya United would see the same scenario played out. Mack would tally 2 goals in 3 test matches before the close of the transfer window.

Bridges F.C.

At the end of 2013, Mack signed a management contract with Bridges FC and began training in their program. Under the direction of club founder Brett Hall, a beloved coach and mentor of his, Mack led the program in scoring. Mack would find the net 9 times in matches against the Dayton Dutch Lions, Charlotte Eagles, Minnesota United, Schwaben AC, Michigan Bucks and scoring a brace against Indy Eleven. Mack transferred his momentum with Bridges into solid form in matches against Scandinavian opposition HB Köge, Ljungskile SK, Degerfors IF and Lidköpings FK. following performances against the latter two, he accepted a trial with IK Sirius. Mack made his skills known at IK Sirius and earned an extension following his form in training. During a reserve match against Ostersunds FK Mack would come off the field after a productive half with a groin injury. After a 3–1 win Mack was diagnosed with a sports hernia and completed a laparoscopic hernia procedure. In December 2014, Mack made a full recovery and returned to training at Bridges FC.

Finland
In March 2015, Mack signed a one-year contract with Ekenäs Sport Club, a newly promoted club in Kakkonen. Tallying 3 goals and 11 assists, Mack would help the club to league security for the 2016 season.

Selfoss
On February 16, 2016, Mack signed a one-year contract with UMF Selfoss in the Icelandic Inkasso-Deildin. 2016 would finish with Mack as Selfoss' top scorer and contributor with 8 goals and 7 assists in all competitions. In November 2016, Mack was re-signed to another one-year contract with the club.

In 2017, Mack would again finish as the club's top goalscorer and contributor with 12 goals and 6 assists in all competitions.

Bhayangkara

In February 2018 Mack accepted an invitation to play in the Kings Cup with Indonesian champion Bhayangkara FC. Mack went on to tally one goal and one assist through test matches and tournament play.

Vestri
On 16 April 2018, Mack signed a one-year contract with Vestri in Iceland 2. league. Finishing one point from promotion, Mack would finish the season with 6 goals and 12 assists in 20 appearances for the Westfjords club.

Víkingur
On January 25, 2019, Mack signed a two-year contract with Icelandic Premier league side Víkingur. The 2019 season would end with Vikingur as Icelandic FA cup champions.

Hamilton
On the 1st of October, Mack signed with the Hamilton Wanderers in the ISPS Handa Premiership.

Napier
In June 2020, the COVID-19 stoppage of the ISPS Handa Premiership would see Mack sign a 2-year contract with New Zealand F.A. Cup champion Napier City Rovers for the winter seasons of 2020/2021. The Virgin Islands winger would finish the season with 5 goals and 4 assists in 12 appearances for the blues.

Hawkes Bay
September 2020 Mack signed a one-year contract with Napier-based club Hawke's Bay United competing in the summer's ISPS Handa Premiership.

Albion Park White Eagles
In January 2021, Mack signed for, New South Wales club, Albion Park White Eagles, who compete in the Illawarra Premier League. By doing so he became the first international player to play in the league. The 2021 Season would be suspended due to COVID-19 lockdown.

Napier
January 2022 Mack re-joined his former club Napier City Rovers for the 2022 New Zealand National League season.

National team 
On 9 September 2018, Mack made his debut for the U.S. Virgin Islands national team during their 8–0 loss to Canada in the CONCACAF Nations League.

International goals
Scores and results list the United States Virgin Islands' goal tally first.

Honors
2019 Icelandic Mjólkurbikarinn Champion

2012 USL Pro Champion

2010 Ligue Nord pas de Calais Promotion

2008 USL Super20 National Champion

References

External links
Charleston Battery bio

1988 births
Living people
Soccer players from Virginia
United States Virgin Islands soccer players
United States Virgin Islands international soccer players
American soccer players
Chicago Fire U-23 players
Charleston Battery players
Knattspyrnufélagið Víkingur players
Hamilton Wanderers players
Hawke's Bay United FC players
Napier City Rovers FC players
USL League Two players
USL Championship players
US Tourcoing FC players
Association football midfielders
J.C. Mack
J.C. Mack